Future Music Festival was an annual music festival featuring Australian and international artists held in Sydney, Melbourne, Brisbane, Adelaide and Perth in Australia and as of 2012 also Kuala Lumpur in Malaysia. The festival was usually held in late February - early March and has been headlined by notable acts including The Prodigy, The Chemical Brothers, New Order, The Stone Roses and most recently Drake.
Several weeks after the 2015 edition of the festival, Mushroom Group announced their decision to scrap any future editions of the festival, however they offered hope for a new festival to take its place.

History
The festival began in 2006 as a one-day independent festival at Sydney's Royal Randwick Racecourse. In 2007 it evolved into a massive travelling festival like the Big Day Out and Soundwave which visited Brisbane, Perth, Sydney, Melbourne and Adelaide. In December 2011, Future Entertainment announced that the Future Music Festival would expand out to Asia for the 2012 festival with a show held in Kuala Lumpur, Malaysia which was headlined by The Chemical Brothers. The Asian leg of the festival has a similarity to the one in Australia with a mixture of local and international acts.

In 2014, Future Music Festival Asia in Kuala Lumpur was unexpectedly cancelled on the third day after a festivalgoer died. These were believed to be related to drug overdoses. Malaysian authorities abruptly closed the event. A year later, post-mortem results showed that six deaths at the festival had been due to heat stroke.

Artist lineups

2006 line-up

Armin Van Buuren
Markus Schulz 
Kai Tracid
Technasia (live)
Pee Wee
Jumping Jack
Nik Fish
Amber Savage
Erick Morillo
David Guetta
Steve Angello
Tocadisco
Ben Morris
Goodwill
Shamus
Ali B
Lee Coombs
Dylan Rhymes
Kid Kenobi & MC Shureshock
Funktrust DJs
James Taylor
Blackstrobe (live)
Coburn
Bang Gang DJs
Sneaky Sound System
Van She
Max Graham
James Lavelle
Ben Korbel
Daniel C
Crispin
Robbie Lowe
Trix
Husky
Goodfella
Johnny Rad
Brenden Fing
Jeff Drake
John Glover

2007 line-up

Carl Cox
Ferry Corsten
Felix Da Housecat
Nick Warren 
X-Press 2
LTJ Bukem & MC Conrad
Tom Novy
Fedde Le Grand
Josh Wink
Princess Superstar
The Egg (LIVE)
Chris Lake
Sander Van Doorn
Rex The Dog (LIVE)
Joachim Garraud
DJ Falcon
Serge Santiago
Sebastien Leger
Bassbin Twins
JDS
Ali b
Infusion (LIVE)
Midnight Juggernauts (LIVE)
TV Rock
Riot in Belgium
Bang Gang DJs
John Course
Dirty South
Goodwill
Oliver Huntemann

2008 line-up

Robbie Rivera & DJ Yoda withdrew from the 2008 lineup.

2009 line-up

No one was withdrawn from the lineup.

2010 line-up

No one was withdrawn from the lineup.

2011 line-up

Etienne De Crecy withdrew from the 2011 lineup.

2012 line-up

Jessie J cancelled her Perth show in 2012.

2013 line-up

Avicii cancelled his first weekend of the festival. The same went for Rita Ora and Magda. Also, DJ Fresh withdrew from the 2013 lineup. Borgore did not go to Malaysia at that time for the festival.

2014 line-up
Deadmau5 - Macklemore & Ryan Lewis -Pharrell Williams - Phoenix - Hardwell - Knife Party - Eric Prydz - Rudimental - Tinie Tempah - Chase & Status - Sub Focus - Netsky - 2 Chainz - Kaskade - Dada Life - Porter Robinson - Naughty Boy - Paul van Dyk - Markus Schulz - ATB - Chuckie - Arty - R3Hab - Martin Garrix - Baauer - Monsta - Helena - Adventure Club - Carnage - Bassjackers - Deniz Koyu - Dannic - Dyro - Cut Copy - Stafford Brothers - Timmy Trumpet - Walden - Tenzin - Will Sparks - Sven Vath - Dubfire* - Maya Jane Coles* - Paul Kalkbrenner* - Gesaffelstein Live - Brodinski - Kaytranada* - Gorgon City - Guy Gerber*

2015 line-up
Drake -
Avicii -
Knife Party - 
The Prodigy -
Afrojack -
Martin Garrix -
Timmy Trumpet - 
Nero -
Darude -
Example -
Die Antwoord -
Sigma -
2 Chainz -
Kiesza -
Tchami -
Blasterjaxx -
Robin Schulz -
Klingande -
Gorgon City -
Carnage -
Bassjackers -
Yellow Claw -
Throttle -
Cocoon presents Sven Väth -
Art Department -
Apollonia : Shonky -
Dan Ghenacia -
Dyed Soundorom -
Hilltop Hoods -

See also 

 Future Music Festival Asia
 Future Entertainment
 Summadayze
 List of electronic music festivals

References

External links 

 Future Entertainment 
 Future Entertainment on Facebook
 Future Music Festival 2010
 About Future Music Festival in Russian 

Music festivals established in 2006
Summer festivals
Concert tours
Hip hop music festivals
Electronic music festivals in Australia
Electronic music festivals in Malaysia
Music festivals in Melbourne
Festivals in Brisbane
Festivals in Sydney
Festivals in Adelaide
Festivals in Perth, Western Australia